Miss Queen Portugal is a national beauty pageant in Portugal. It is responsible for selecting the country's representative to Miss Earth, which is an annual international beauty pageant promoting environmental awareness.

History
Miss Queen Portugal Organization, whose main legacy are environmental causes, follows the platform of the  Miss Earth Foundation. The winner of Miss Queen Portugal is the Portuguese representative in the Miss Earth pageant, which is one of the Big Four international beauty pageants in the world.

The Miss Queen Portugal pageant was first held in 2013 in Caminha, Portugal won by Solange Duarte, from Ovar. However,  the first delegate chosen by Miss Queen Portugal Organizing Committee to represent Portugal in the Miss Earth pageant was Susana Nogueira and participated in the  Miss Earth 2011 and finished as one of the Top 16 semifinalists. Portugal's delegates in the Miss Earth 2004 and Miss Earth 2005 were selected by a different organization.

The pageant is a search for the most beautiful women of Portugal to serve as a role model dedicated to uphold the advocacy to preserve and restore of the earth.

In 2022 the Miss Queen Portugal acquired the license of Miss Universe pageant.

Titleholders

Miss Queen Portugal
The Miss Queen Portugal winners expected to be at Miss Earth pageant.

Miss Portugal Universo
Began 2022, the Miss Queen Portugal Organization held separate contest to Miss Universe. The winner will represent Portugal at the Miss Universe competition.

International pageants
Miss Universe Portugal Before 2011 Miss Portugal 1959 to Miss Portugal 2001 winner participated at Miss Universe competition. Between 2002 and 2010 there was no franchise holder to sign up the Miss Universe organization. began 2011 the new pageant held as 'Miss Universo Portugal" contest and it continued in 2014 as a beginning from Miss República Portuguesa by Isidiro de Brito Directorship. Since 2014 the Portuguese representative at Miss Universe will be crowned at Miss Universo Portugal competition (separate contest but still in under Isidiro de Brito directorship). On occasion, when the winner does not qualify (due to age) for either contest, a runner-up is sent. Beginning in 2022, a separate Miss Universo Portugal has been created.''

Miss Earth Portugal

See also
Miss República Portuguesa

References

External links
Official website

Miss Earth by country
Portuguese awards
Beauty pageants in Portugal